The Anniversary Game was a daily syndicated game show that involved three married couples competing for points and prizes by performing stunts and answering questions, à la Beat the Clock. The host was Alan Hamel, with voice-over artist Dean Webber announcing.

The program was taped in San Francisco at KGO-TV, formerly the home of Oh My Word.

Game play
The object of the game was to earn more points than the other couples to win the "anniversary surprise".  The first round consisted of each spouse predicting how the other would react to a practical joke or zany gag.  If they were correct, the team would win points.

In the second round, the couples teamed up against each other in order to complete the stunt.  The winning team would then receive points.

In the final round, all the couples competed against one another to answer general knowledge questions (this was not a timed portion of the game; there was no countdown clock as in the Sale of the Century speed round).  Point values were determined by a randomly flashing point-value board (see image, right) showing numbered lights with values ranging from 1 to 10 points; a player sounding in to answer pressed his/her button, stopping the flashing sequence on a particular point value.  A special 1-point prize (such as a vacation trip) was always at the middle of this board (and rarely hit).  The board had three rows each of which had approximately a dozen point values (the middle row was split by the "big 1" space).  A player sounding in was recognized by the couple's name and then the point value - e.g., "4 points, Shermans."  The team with the most points overall won a merchandise prize called the "anniversary surprise".

Trivia
One of the prize models during the series run was Suzanne Somers, whom Hamel would marry in 1977.

Footage of the series is heard and shown playing on TV in the 1970 Marlo Thomas film Jenny.

Series status
The series has not been seen since its original run. It remains unknown as to whether or not video tape of the series still exists; but most likely the series has never been archived and videotape of the series is likely destroyed.

References
 Encyclopedia of TV Game Shows, 2nd ed., Schwartz, Ryan, Wostbrock

External links
 Anniversary Game on IMDb

First-run syndicated television programs in the United States
1960s American game shows
1970s American game shows
1969 American television series debuts
1970 American television series endings